SRC Dubočica is an indoor sporting arena located in Leskovac, Serbia. The capacity of the arena is 3,600 people. It is currently home to the Zdravlje basketball  team.

See also
List of indoor arenas in Serbia
Leskovac

References 

Indoor arenas in Serbia
Basketball venues in Serbia
Sport in Leskovac